The third series of the Ojarumaru anime series aired from April 5 to December 1, 2000 on NHK for a total of 90 episodes.

The series' opening theme is "Utahito" (詠人) by Saburō Kitajima. The ending theme is "Kooni Trio no Theme" (子鬼トリオのテーマ The Theme of the Oni Child Trio) by Kazuya Ichijou, Omi Minami, and Yūji Ueda.

The series was released on VHS by Nippon Crown across fifteen volumes, each containing six episodes, from June 21, 2000 to February 21, 2001. Nippon Crown later released the series on DVD across two compilation volumes, each containing ten selected episodes, simultaneously on January 22, 2003. The first volume contains episodes 181, 185, 186, 201, 214, 215, 217, 221, and 224. The second volume contains episodes 225, 230, 238, 240, 242, 246, 251, 253, 264, and 270.

Episodes

References

External links
 Series 3 episode list

Ojarumaru episode lists